Jarrod Kayler-Thomson (born 26 July 1985) is an Australian rules footballer. He had played in the Australian Football League with the Hawthorn Football Club. He currently plays with the Subiaco Football Club in the West Australian Football League.

Kayler-Thomson was teammate of Jordan Lewis, when the two were underage players at the Geelong Falcons in 2003.

Kayler-Thomson joined the Perth in the West Australian Football League (WAFL) and played 88 games for them between 2005 and 2009.  He won the Vince Pendal Award for best clubman in 2009. Kayler-Thomson was the leading goalkicker for Perth in 2007 with 41 goals.

In the 2008 Queensland versus WAFL match in Townsville, Kayler-Thomson was listed as best on ground.

Drafted to the Hawks with the 29th selection of the 2010 AFL Rookie Draft, Kayler-Thomson was elevated to the senior list prior to the opening round of the 2010 AFL season due to a spate of injuries to senior players.

He debuted against Melbourne in the opening game of the 2010 season collecting 6 marks and 17 disposals.

Hawthorn delisted him at the end of the 2010 season so he returned to Perth.

He reached his 100th game upon returning in 2011 before then missing all but two matches in 2012 due to a shoulder injury. That gave him a chance to reflect and realise he wanted a fresh start in the WAFL, and that's how he ended up at Subiaco.

Statistics

|- style=background:#EAEAEA
| 2010 ||  || 45
| 3 || 1 || 2 || 30 || 24 || 54 || 18 || 5 || 0.3 || 0.7 || 10.0 || 8.0 || 18.0 || 6.0 || 1.7 || 0
|- class="sortbottom"
! colspan=3| Career
! 3 !! 1 !! 2 !! 30 !! 24 !! 54 !! 18 !! 5 !! 0.3 !! 0.7 !! 10.0 !! 8.0 !! 18.0 !! 6.0 !! 1.7 !! 0
|}

References

External links
 

Hawthorn Football Club players
Perth Football Club players
Subiaco Football Club players
Box Hill Football Club players
1985 births
Living people
Australian rules footballers from Victoria (Australia)
Geelong Falcons players
Mansfield Football Club players